Mystical Marriage of St. Catherine is an oil on panel painting by the Italian Renaissance painter Filippino Lippi, dated 1501. It is housed in the Isolani Chapel of the Basilica di San Domenico, a church of the Dominican Order in Bologna.

The painting pivots around the scene of the mystical marriage of St. Catherine of Alexandria, while around her a sacra conversazione is held. Their participants are, on the right, St. Paul and St. Sebastian and, on the left, St. Peter and St. John the Baptist. The scene setting is rather conventional, although Lippi's usual taste for bizarre decorations can be seen in details such as the harpy sculpted on a corner of Virgin's throne or the fragment of the wheel on which St. Catherine would have been tortured. Also the architecture in the background is rather classical.

References
Page at artonline.it 

1503 paintings
Paintings by Filippino Lippi
Lippi
Lippi
Lippi
Lippi
Lippi